"Wow Wow" is a song by Argentine singer-songwriter María Becerra featuring American singer Becky G. It was written by Becerra, Becky G, Enzo Sauthier and Elena Rose, and produced by Big One. The song was released on 26 August 2021 as the fifth single from her debut studio album, Animal.

Background
On August 16 2021 María Becerra revealed the title and released date for her debut album Animal, continuation of her first extended play (EP) Animal, Pt. 1. The song title was revealed on 23 August 2021, with an announcement of the music video. The song was officially released on 25 August 2021 alongside the release of Animal.

Critical reception

Billboard called the song a "hard-knock reggaeton that has female empowerment anthem potential".

Commercial performance

In Argentina, the song debuted at number 45 on the Billboard Argentina Hot 100 during the tracking week of 4 September 2021. On its second week, the song rose forty-one spots to the top 5 at number 4. The song eventually reached its peak in its fourth week at number 2, becoming Becerra’s highest charting song since "Qué más pues?" and Becky G’s first top 3 since her 2018 collaboration "Cuando te Besé". The song spent 37 weeks on the chart.

Music video

The music video for "Wow Wow" was directed by Squid and Julián Levy and was released on 25 August 2021 simultaneously with the rest of Becerra’s debut album Animal. 

The video begins at an after party, in which there’s women sleeping including Becerra who’s waking up and starts singing. Then Becerra, Gomez and all the girls are seen at the party dancing and singing in the pool. Various scenes show Becerra and other girls as they dance and sit in a living room’s sofa. Both singers appear with outdoor and futuristic outfits.

As of December 2022, the song has a accumulated a total of 130M views.

Charts

Weekly charts

Year-end charts

References

2021 singles
2021 songs
María Becerra songs
Becky G songs
Spanish-language songs
Songs written by Becky G
Female vocal duets